Furcinetechma is a genus of moths belonging to the family Tortricidae.

Species 
Furcinetechma labonitae Razowski & Wojtusiak, 2009
Furcinetechma magnifurca Razowski & Wojtusiak, 2008
Furcinetechma sangaycola Razowski & Wojtusiak, 2009

Etymology 
The name refers to the bifurcate uncus and the name of the closely related genus Netechma.

See also 
 List of Tortricidae genera

References 

 , 2008, Genus 19 (3): 497–575. 
 , 2009: Tortricidae (Lepidoptera) from the mountains of Ecuador and remarks on their geographical distribution. Part IV. Eastern Cordillera. Acta Zoologica Cracoviensia 51B (1-2): 119–187. doi:10.3409/azc.52b_1-2.119-187. Full article:  .

External links
tortricidae.com

Euliini